Sławoszewo may refer to the following places:
Sławoszewo, Greater Poland Voivodeship (west-central Poland)
Sławoszewo, Kuyavian-Pomeranian Voivodeship (north-central Poland)
Sławoszewo, West Pomeranian Voivodeship (north-west Poland)